Pierre le Pelley III, 15th Seigneur of Sark (1799–1839) was Seigneur of Sark from 1820 to 1839. He drowned when the boat carrying him to Guernsey was lost in a tidal race just off the coast of Sark.

References

Pelley, Pierre III le
Seigneurs of Sark
Year of birth unknown
Pierre III
1799 births

it:Signori di Sark#Lista dei signori e dame di Sark